The 2016 Magyar Kupa, known as  for sponsorship reasons, is the 90th edition of the tournament.

Schedule
The rounds of the 2016–17 competition are scheduled as follows:

Matches

Preliminary round
The first round ties are scheduled for 23, 24 September 2016.

Group A
Tournament will be played at Kemény Dénes Sportuszoda, Miskolc.

Group B
Tournament will be played at Kanizsa Uszoda és Strandfürdő, Nagykanizsa.

Group C
Tournament will be played at Abay Nemes Oszkár Sportuszoda, Pécs.

Group D
Tournament will be played at Szőnyi úti uszoda, Budapest.

Quarter-finals
Quarter-final matches were played on 26 November and 3 December 2016.

|}

Final four
The final four will be held on 17 and 18 December 2016 at the Tüskecsarnok Uszoda in Budapest, XI. ker.

Semi-finals

Final

Final standings

See also
 2016–17 Országos Bajnokság I

References

External links
 Hungarian Water Polo Federaration 

Seasons in Hungarian water polo competitions
Hungary
Magyar Kupa Men